Hamer v. Sidway,  124 N.Y. 538,  27 N.E. 256 (N.Y. 1891),  was a noted decision by the  New York Court of Appeals  (the highest court in the state),  New York,  United States.   Hamer v. Sidway is an important case in  American contract law which established that forbearance of legal rights (voluntarily abstaining from one's legal rights)  on  promises  of future  benefit  made by other parties  can constitute valid  consideration  (the  element  of exchange generally needed to establish a contract's enforceability in  common law systems), and, in addition, that unilateral contracts (those that benefit only one party) were valid under New York law.

Facts
Louisa Hamer (Plaintiff) brought suit against Franklin Sidway, the executor of the estate of William E. Story I (Defendant), for the sum of $5,000. On March 20, 1869, William E. Story had promised his nephew, William E. Story II, $5,000 if his nephew would abstain from drinking alcohol, using tobacco, swearing, and playing cards or billiards for money until the nephew reached 21 years of age. Story II accepted the promise of his uncle and did refrain from the prohibited acts until he turned the agreed-upon age of 21. After celebrating his 21st birthday on January 31, 1875, Story II wrote to his uncle and requested the promised $5,000. The uncle responded to his nephew in a letter dated February 6, 1875, in which he told his nephew that he would fulfill his promise. Story I also stated that he would prefer to wait until his nephew was older before actually handing over the extremely large sum of money. The elder Story also declared in his letter that the money owed to his nephew would accrue interest while he held it on his nephew's behalf. The younger Story consented to his uncle's wishes and agreed that the money would remain with his uncle until Story II became older. William E. Story I died on January 29, 1887, without having transferred any of the money owed to his nephew. Story II had meanwhile transferred the $5,000 financial interest to his wife; Story II's wife had later transferred this financial interest to Louisa Hamer on assignment. The elder Story's estate refused to grant Hamer the money, believing there was no binding contract due to a lack of consideration. As a result, Hamer sued the estate's executor, Franklin Sidway.

Opinion of the court
The Court of Appeals reversed and directed that the judgment of the trial court be affirmed, with costs payable out of the estate. Judge Alton Parker (later Chief Judge of the Court of Appeals), writing for a unanimous court, wrote that the forbearance of legal rights by Story II, namely the consensual abstinence from "drinking liquor, using tobacco, swearing, and playing cards or billiards for money until he should become 21 years of age" constituted consideration in exchange for the promise given by Story I. Because the forbearance was valid consideration given by a party (Story II) in exchange for a promise to perform by another party (Story I), the promiser was contractually obligated to fulfil the promise.

Parker cited the Exchequer Chamber's 1875 definition of consideration: "A valuable consideration in the sense of the law may consist either in some right, interest, profit or benefit accruing to the one party, or some forbearance, detriment, loss or responsibility given, suffered or undertaken by the other." The executor of Story I's estate, Sidway, was therefore legally bound to deliver the promised $5,000 to whoever currently held the interest in the sum, which by the time of the trial was Hamer.

Influence of the case
Hamer is very common reading in first-year contracts courses at  American  law schools. The view of contracts operative in Hamer was grounded in a particular theory of consideration, the "benefit-detriment theory" (as exemplified in the Exchequer Chamber's 1875 definition).   However, since the early 20th century (especially as embodied in the First and Second Restatements of Contracts), a dominant view has been the "bargain theory." According to the "bargain theory," a typical contract must consist of a bargained-for exchange where the consideration offered by one party (promisee) induces the making of a promise by another party (promisor), and the promisee, having been induced by the promise, gives this consideration.   Thus Hamer was decided on the basis of a legal theory that has largely been replaced or supplemented by newer theory, meaning that similar cases may be viewed differently by contemporary courts.

References

External links
 Hamer v. Sidway - Court Decision
 Hamer v. Sidway Case Brief at LexRoll.com

United States contract case law